Ohio is a 2003 double studio album by the Ohio-based folk music band Over the Rhine. The group's seventh album overall, it was released as both a double CD and limited edition double vinyl LP set.

A rerecorded version of a song from these sessions, "Last Night On Earth Again", was released on the Discount Fireworks compilation.

Track listing
All songs written by Karin Bergquist and/or Linford Detweiler.

Disc one
"B.P.D." - 4:31
"What I'll Remember Most" (Detweiler) – 4:28
"Show Me" – 4:20
"Jesus In New Orleans" - 5:45
"Ohio" (Bergquist) - 5:13
"Suitcase" - 3:25
"Anything At All" (Bergquist) - 3:36
"Professional Daydreamer" - 4:30
"Lifelong Fling" - 5:45
"Changes Come" - 5:31

Disc two
"Long Lost Brother" (Detweiler) - 4:41
"She" - 4:32
"Nobody Number One" - 4:15
"Cruel And Pretty" (Detweiler) - 4:16
"Remind Us" (Bergquist) - 3:05
"How Long Have You Been Stoned" - 3:40
"When You Say Love" - 2:45
"Fool" - 4:04
"Hometown Boy" (Bergquist) - 3:56
"Bothered" - 5:07
"Idea #21 (Not Too Late)" (unlisted track) - 3:41

Personnel
Karin Bergquist - Vocals, Piano, Acoustic Guitar, Percussion
Linford Detweiler - Bass, Piano, Organ, Wurlitzer Electric Piano, Mellotron, Mini-Moog, Acoustic Guitar, Electric Guitar

Additional personnel
Tony Paoletta: Pedal Steel, Dobro, Acoustic Slide
Will Sayles: Drums and Percussion
Devon Ashley: Drums and Percussion
Paul Mahern: Percussion, Mini-Moog
Jake Smith: Bass
Vess Ruhtenberg: Electric Guitar, Hand-Clap Arrangement
Jason Wilbur: Electric Guitar
Megan Weeder: Violin
Tyron Cooper: Background Vocals, Choir Arrangement, featuring Stephanie Parker and Natasha Evans

References

Over the Rhine (band) albums
2003 albums
Back Porch Records albums